The Journal of Environmental Psychology is a peer-reviewed academic journal published by Elsevier. Its founding editor was David Canter (University of Liverpool) back in 1980. From 2004 to 2016, Robert Gifford (University of Victoria) was the editor-in-chief. In 2017 and 2018, Florian G. Kaiser (Otto-von-Guericke University) and Jeffrey Joireman (Washington State University) were the co-chief editors. Since 2019, Sander van der Linden (University of Cambridge) is the editor-in-chief. The journal is the primary outlet for academic research in environmental psychology and reports scientific research on all human interactions with the built, social, and natural environment, with an emphasis on the individual and small-group level of analysis. The journal is published in association with the International Association of Applied Psychology (IAAP).

According to the Journal Citation Reports, Journal of Environmental Psychology has a 2020 impact factor of 5.192.

References

External links
 

Elsevier academic journals
English-language journals
Social psychology journals
Environmental social science journals
Publications established in 1980
Quarterly journals
Environmental psychology